The Women's 10 km competition of the open water swimming events at the 2015 World Aquatics Championships was held on 28 July 2015.

Results
The race was started at 12:00.

References

Women's 10 km
World Aquatics Championships
2015 in women's swimming